USS Nantucket (LCS-27) will be a  littoral combat ship of the United States Navy. She will be the third commissioned ship in naval service named after Nantucket.

Marinette Marine was awarded the contract to build the ship on 6 October 2017.

Design 
In 2002, the US Navy initiated a program to develop the first of a fleet of littoral combat ships. The Navy initially ordered two monohull ships from Lockheed Martin, which became known as the Freedom-class littoral combat ships after the first ship of the class, . Odd-numbered U.S. Navy littoral combat ships are built using the Freedom-class monohull design, while even-numbered ships are based on a competing design, the trimaran hull  from General Dynamics. The initial order of littoral combat ships involved a total of four ships, including two of the Freedom-class design.  Nantucket will be the fourteenth Freedom-class littoral combat ship to be built.

Construction and Career 
The ship was christened on 7 August 2021 and launched into the Menominee River.

References

 

Freedom-class littoral combat ships
Lockheed Martin
2021 ships